Yogendran Duckson Puslas (4 April 1990 – 26 February 2022) was a Sri Lankan professional footballer who played as a defender for TC Sports Club and Sri Lanka national team. He was recognised as one of the stalwarts of Sri Lankan defence line-up.

Career
In 2020, Puslas signed for Maldivian side TC Sports Club. Later, he received a contract to play for Maldivian Club Valencia ahead of the 2021–22 season. 

He was included in the Sri Lankan squad which competed at the 2021 SAFF Championship.  Duckson played an influential role in Sri Lanka's 0–0 goalless draw against India during the 2021 SAFF Championship group stage match which also ended Sri Lanka's losing streak against India after a long gap of 18 years. He was awarded the player of the match for his contributions which led to a goalless draw. He was an integral member of the Sri Lankan team which emerged as runner-up to Seychelles in the final of the 2021 Four Nations Football Tournament which was held in Sri Lanka where Seychelles emerged victorious in penalty shootout.

Prior to his untimely death, he was playing for Club Valencia in the Dhivehi Premier League. However, he was not included in the Valencia lineup in a group stage match which was held on 26 February 2022 (the death took place on the same day) in the 2020–21 Dhivehi Premier League due to sustaining injuries.

Personal life and death
Puslas died on 26 February 2022, at the age of 31. He was found dead in his apartment during his stay in Maldives. His cause of death is speculated to be a suicide but the cause of his death is yet to be determined and yet to be confirmed by the officials as it is largely unknown.

References

External links
 
 

1990 births
2022 deaths
People from Mannar, Sri Lanka
Sri Lankan footballers
Association football defenders
Sri Lanka international footballers
Sri Lanka Football Premier League players
T.C. Sports Club players
Club Valencia players
Sri Lankan expatriate footballers
Sri Lankan expatriate sportspeople in the Maldives
Expatriate footballers in the Maldives